The Napoleon House, also known as the Mayor Girod House or Nicolas Girod House, is a historic building at 500 Chartres Street in the French Quarter of New Orleans, Louisiana, United States. Built in 1794 and enlarged in 1814, its name derives from the local legend that it was intended as a residence for Napoleon Bonaparte after his exile. A plan to bring Napoleon to Louisiana was halted by news of his death in 1821.

The building was also the home of Nicholas Girod (d. 1840), mayor of New Orleans. One of the city's finer private residences in the early 19th century, the building housed a local grocery at the start of the 20th century and since 1914 has operated as a restaurant called Napoleon House. The upper floors of the building have been converted to apartments, where some of the original interior decorative elements may still be seen.

It was declared to be a National Historic Landmark in 1970, as one of the city's finest examples of French-influenced architecture. It is a three-story brick stuccoed building, with a dormered hip roof and cupola. Shallow ironwork balconies with austere styling adorn the second floor.

The Napoleon House restaurant has an old-time New Orleans atmosphere and serves such traditional dishes as red beans and rice, gumbo, and jambalaya; it has been particularly known among locals for its muffaletta sandwiches. The bar is known for serving its "Pimm's Cup" cocktail. Classical music is played on the sound system.

See also
List of National Historic Landmarks in Louisiana
National Register of Historic Places listings in Orleans Parish, Louisiana

References

External links

Napoleon House's website
Historic Architecture of the Napoleon House
Historic Architecture of the Napoleon House TV Interview

National Historic Landmarks in Louisiana
French Quarter
Houses completed in 1797
Restaurants in New Orleans
Houses on the National Register of Historic Places in Louisiana
Drinking establishments in New Orleans
Houses in New Orleans
National Register of Historic Places in New Orleans
Historic district contributing properties in Louisiana
Drinking establishments on the National Register of Historic Places in Louisiana